The Amphibi-Con 25, often just called the Amphibi-Con, is an American trailerable sailboat that was designed by E. Farnham Butler and Cyrus Hamlin as a racer-cruiser and first built in 1954. The design was one of the first "trailer sailers" and helped popularize this class of boat.

Production
The design was built by Butler's Mount Desert Yachts, Sailstar Boats and Burr Brothers Boats in the United States, starting in 1954. Some were also built in Finland. A total of 125 boats were completed, but it is now out of production.

Design
The Amphibi-Con 25 is a recreational keelboat, initially built predominantly of glued wooden strip construction. In 1964 Sailstar Boats constructed a mold and built some from fiberglass, with wood trim and these were sold as kits, semi-finished or ready-to-sail.

The boat has a fractional sloop rig, with a masthead sloop rig optional. The hull has a raked stem, a plumb transom, reverse sheer, a keel-mounted rudder controlled by a tiller and a fixed long keel with a cutaway forefoot, plus a retractable centerboard. The wooden version displaces  and carries  of lead ballast, while the fiberglass version displaces .

The boat is normally fitted with a small  outboard motor mounted in an aft lazarette well, for docking and maneuvering.

The design includes a canvas-covered cabin that allows sunshine and fresh air in fine weather or covering in inclement weather. The boat has sleeping accommodation for four people, with a double "V"-berth in the bow cabin and two straight settees in the main cabin. The galley is located on both sides, just aft of the forward cabin. The galley is equipped with a two-burner stove on the starboard side and a sink and icebox on the port side. The head is located just aft of the bow cabin on the port side.

For sailing the design is equipped with a topping lift that runs from a "V"-shaped boomkin and may also be fitted with a spinnaker for downwind sailing.

Operational history
The boat is supported by an active class club that organizes racing events, the Amphibi-con Association.

In a 2010 review Steve Henkel wrote, "among her comp[etitor]s, the A/C 25 is the lightest boat with the least ballast and close to the highest SA/D ratio, indicating that she will be among the liveliest in light air, but with her relatively low Motion Index, will tend to be jumpy in a seaway. We recall spending some time on one of these boats with another couple, and we found it to be comfortable, light, and airy."

See also
List of sailing boat types

References

Keelboats
1950s sailboat type designs
Sailing yachts
Trailer sailers
Sailboat type designs by Cyrus Hamlin
Sailboat type designs by E. Farnham Butler
Sailboat types built by Mount Desert Yachts
Sailboat types built by Sailstar Boats
Sailboat types built by Burr Brothers Boats